The 1915 Rutgers Queensmen football team represented Rutgers University as an independent during the 1915 college football season. In their third season under head coach George Sanford, the Queensmen compiled a 7–1 record and outscored their opponents, 351 to 33. The team shut out four of its eight opponents, and its only loss was to Princeton by a 10 to 0 score. Coach Sanford was inducted into the College Football Hall of Fame in 1971.

Schedule

References

Rutgers
Rutgers Scarlet Knights football seasons
Rutgers Queensmen football